Ruby C. Williams (June 9, 1928 – August 8, 2022) was an American folk artist.

She was born and grew up in Bealsville, Florida, a community formed by freed slaves, including Williams' great grandmother,  Mary Reddick.

Known as Miss Ruby, she was an evangelical minister in Paterson, New Jersey, for 25 years. After she returned to Florida she ran a produce stand and "walk in" gallery on State Road 60.  A self-taught artist, her career in folk art began in 1981 when her hand-painted signs, advertising her fruits and vegetables, were noticed by a local photographer and folk art collector, Bud Lee, who helped her to draw the attention of local media and institutions, including the Polk Museum of Art in Lakeland, mounted exhibitions.

In 2005 she received the Florida Folk Heritage Award and was included in the show On Their Own – Selected Self-taught Artists  at the Smithsonian Anacostia Museum in Washington D.C.

References

External links

 Caltech Alumni
 Story Corps

1928 births
2022 deaths
American women painters
Painters from Florida
Folk artists
Women outsider artists
People from Hillsborough County, Florida
20th-century American painters
20th-century American women artists
21st-century American painters
21st-century American women artists